Freedom is a census-designated place (CDP) in Santa Cruz County, California, United States. The population was 3,070 at the 2010 census.

Geography
Freedom is located at  (36.940452, -121.789376). It is adjacent to and blends with the incorporated city of Watsonville.

Demographics

2010
The 2010 United States Census reported that Freedom had a population of 3,070. The racial makeup of Freedom was 1,452 (47.3%) White, 44 (1.4%) African American, 31 (1.0%) Native American, 100 (3.3%) Asian,  1,285 (41.9%) from other races, and 158 (5.1%) from two or more races. Hispanic or Latino of any race were 2,170 persons (70.7%).

The Census reported that 99.8% of the population lived in households and 0.2% were institutionalized.

There were 776 households, out of which 394 (50.8%) had children under the age of 18 living in them, 445 (57.3%) were opposite-sex married couples living together, 124 (16.0%) had a female householder with no husband present, 73 (9.4%) had a male householder with no wife present.  There were 63 (8.1%) unmarried opposite-sex partnerships, and 11 (1.4%) same-sex married couples or partnerships. 102 households (13.1%) were made up of individuals, and 44 (5.7%) had someone living alone who was 65 years of age or older. The average household size was 3.95.  There were 642 families (82.7% of all households); the average family size was 4.12.

The population was spread out, with 904 people (29.4%) under the age of 18, 347 people (11.3%) aged 18 to 24, 891 people (29.0%) aged 25 to 44, 655 people (21.3%) aged 45 to 64, and 273 people (8.9%) who were 65 years of age or older.  The median age was 30.2 years. For every 100 females, there were 103.0 males.  For every 100 females age 18 and over, there were 101.7 males.

The homeowner vacancy rate was 1.4%; the rental vacancy rate was 2.2%. 60.9% of the population lived in owner-occupied housing units and 38.9% lived in rental housing units.

2000
As of the census of 2000, there were 6,000 people, 1,596 households, and 1,182 families residing in the CDP. The racial makeup of the CDP was 44.42% White, 0.48% African American, 1.87% Native American, 3.35% Asian, 0.22% Pacific Islander, 43.72% from other races, and 5.95% from two or more races. Hispanic or Latino of any race were 69.42% of the population.

There were 1,596 households, out of which 41.7% had children under the age of 18 living with them, 54.8% were married couples living together, 12.5% had a female householder with no husband present, and 25.9% were non-families. 21.1% of all households were made up of individuals, and 14.8% had someone living alone who was 65 years of age or older.  The average household size was 3.75 and the average family size was 4.23.

In the CDP, the population was spread out, with 30.8% under the age of 18, 11.5% from 18 to 24, 29.8% from 25 to 44, 17.1% from 45 to 64, and 10.9% who were 65 years of age or older.  The median age was 30 years. For every 100 females, there were 102.4 males.  For every 100 females age 18 and over, there were 102.3 males.

The median income for a household in the CDP was $40,600, and the median income for a family was $43,056. Males had a median income of $27,083 versus $23,056 for females. The per capita income for the CDP was $13,690.  About 12.9% of families and 17.4% of the population were below the poverty line, including 22.3% of those under age 18 and 8.2% of those age 65 or over.

Government

See also

 List of census-designated places in California
 KPIG-FM

References

External links

Census-designated places in Santa Cruz County, California
Census-designated places in California